ABC Funfit is a series of short American television segments that were broadcast in 1985 and aired twice a day during ABC's Saturday morning cartoon programs.  The segments were five minutes long and presented exercises and information to promote children's physical fitness.  Olympic gold medalist Mary Lou Retton hosted the series, assisted by the "Funfit Kids" (Ericka Pazcoquin, Bradley Kane, Melissa Kern and Efrain Bracero).  The show was choreographed by Lynne Taylor-Corbett.  The album ABC Funfit featuring Mary Lou Retton was released in 1985.

References

External links

American Broadcasting Company original programming
1980s American children's television series
1985 American television series debuts
1985 American television series endings
American children's education television series
Exercise television shows
English-language television shows